Dormant Beauty is a 2012 Italian drama film directed by Marco Bellocchio and starring Toni Servillo and Isabelle Huppert. The film was selected to compete for the Golden Lion at the 69th Venice International Film Festival. For this film Maya Sansa won the David di Donatello for Best Supporting Actress.

Plot
The film revolves around the true story of Eluana Englaro, a girl felt into an irreversible coma in 1992 following a car accident and deemed incurable. After long years of struggle, her parents opted to euthanize her, asking the authorization to the competent authority and obtaining it in 2009. The Catholic Church and some political parties during the Berlusconi IV Cabinet ruthlessly attacked them. Eluana is never shown in the film, but images of television programs and newspapers mentioning her case are constantly in the background reminding the audience about her presence.

The plot features several stories chained to themselves and to the themes of life and death. Uliano is a Member of the Parliament elected for Forza Italia who refuses to align himself with the party and plans to vote against a bill that will make euthanasia illegal; his daughter Maria joins an anti-euthanasia Christian prayer group in front of Eluana's hospital, but then she falls in love with Roberto, an activist for the opposite pro-euthanasia group whose brother Pipino suffers from bipolar disorder. A great French actress referred as the "Divine Mother" is married to an Italian actor, but since when their daughter Rosa has felt into a coma she stopped caring about her husband, son and work, spending her whole time praying for her health. Rossa is a young woman addicted to heroin with suicidal tendencies saved and eventually persuaded to live by Pallido, a doctor who felt in love with her.

Cast
 Toni Servillo as Uliano Beffardi
 Alba Rohrwacher as Maria
 Isabelle Huppert as Divina Madre
 Maya Sansa as Rossa
 Michele Riondino as Roberto
 Gianmarco Tognazzi as Divina Madre's husband
 Roberto Herlitzka as Psychiatrist senator

Awards and nominations
 Brian Award at the 69th Venice International Film Festival.

See also
 Isabelle Huppert on screen and stage

References

External links
 

2012 films
2012 drama films
Italian drama films
2010s Italian-language films
Films directed by Marco Bellocchio
French drama films
Films about euthanasia
2010s French films
2010s Italian films